Cognizance may refer to:

 Cognizance IIT Roorkee, an annual technical festival held at Indian Institute of Technology Roorkee
 Cognizance, a heraldic badge, emblem, or device formerly worn by retainers of a royal or noble house
 Cognizance (law), the action of taking judicial notice, satisfaction to court from the available materials as to the existence of prima facie to proceed further for any enquiry or trial
 Church of Cognizance, a church founded in 1991

See also 
 Cognizant, an American multinational corporation